Matty Dale (born 10 October 1986) is an English former professional rugby league footballer who played in the 2000s and 2010s.

Background
Dale was born in Kingston upon Hull, Humberside.

Playing career

He played for Whitehaven and the Featherstone Rovers in the National Leagues and Hull F.C. and the Wakefield Trinity Wildcats in the Super League.
He joined Featherstone Rovers in 2009 and made more than 150 appearances for the club, however his career was interrupted by injury in 2014 and he underwent knee reconstruction. As a free agent he signed for the York City Knights in April 2016 but following an injury-hit season he announced his retirement at the end of the year.

References

External links
(archived by web.archive.org) Profile at featherstonerovers.net
Hull profile

1986 births
Living people
English rugby league players
Featherstone Rovers players
Hull F.C. players
Rugby league second-rows
Rugby league players from Kingston upon Hull
Wakefield Trinity players
Whitehaven R.L.F.C. players
York City Knights players